Koselao is a village in Sumerpur tehsil of Pali district in Rajasthan state of India. It is located near Sanderao.

Here are a lot of temples including chamunda mataji temple situated on lambiya bhakri ,  baba ramdevji temple at baba gaon road , Shani Dev Temple at Shaneshwar Chauk , In Koselao there are some Jain Temples too cause there were Jain people too in around 90s period but now they have left this town for their business purposes.

Geography

It has an average elevation of 239 metres (787 feet). There is one pond also in Koselao.

Demographics

 India census, Koselao had a population of 10,227. Males constitute 51% of the population and females 49%.

References

Villages in Pali district